Chashma is located in Mianwali District near Kundian, Punjab, Pakistan. It is situated at the left bank of the river Indus, in close proximity of the Koh-i-Suleiman mountain range. Chashma is famous for the well-known Chashma Barrage built on the Indus River. Also nearby is the Chashma Nuclear Power Plant of the Pakistan Atomic Energy Commission, with two units of 300 megawatt CHASHNUPP-1 and CHASHNUPP-2 and two 325 megawatt CHASHNUPP-3 and CHASHNUPP-4. It is located close to the kho-i-suleman range

Populated places in Mianwali District
Nuclear history of Pakistan